The Verco Building is a building in the Australian state of South Australia located in the Adelaide city centre at 178–179 North Terrace, Adelaide, and is today part of the Myer Centre.

History
The building was constructed for Dr. William Alfred Verco (4 November 1867 – 29 April 1942), a local physician and property developer and grandson of James Crabb Verco. Verco Building was Adelaide's first "skyscraper". At a total of 6 storeys with a basement, it remained the tallest building in Adelaide until the early 1930s.

Verco bought the two-storey doctors' consulting rooms on the corner of North Terrace and Stephens Place, one block east of King William Street, from Dr. Allan Campbell in 1911. The architect was Eric H. McMichael, who was married to Verco's niece Constance. It was his first architectural commission, and led to a successful architectural career. The initial plans McMichael drew up were completed for Verco in 2 weeks, and depicted a large seven-storey building with basement. Two weeks later, on 12 August 1911, the plans were resubmitted to Verco with changes for a more friendly layout for tenants. The project was developed in two stages.

Wanting to pioneer large building construction in Adelaide, Verco pioneered reinforced concrete building by liaising with concrete specialists in Adelaide and in Melbourne. Today, the building is still one of the best examples of this construction type.

Excavation commenced on 9 September 1911, and after some delay due to weather, was completed on 21 October 1911. By 19 February 1912, the basement and ground floors were done and concreting was continuing. Verco was determined for the building to be fully complete by the end of 1912, as he was wishing to commence other projects in Adelaide. As a result, he instructed more builders to enter the site, the extensive detail on some facades to be reduced, and for the seventh storey to be omitted (although the building could support it).  The first stage was completed in September 1912, with only some parts of the fit out left to complete. The second stage was completed in 1915.

Verco had wanted to spend only £30,000, (almost A$11,000,000 (2007)), but McMichael's estimate was £31,200 (A$11,440,000 (2007)). It was estimated the final cost to Verco was £30,250, (roughly A$11,090,000 (2007)), as the seventh storey was omitted.

Building Specifications
Specification details:

Steel
 tensile working stress 7.5 tons per square inch
 in shear 5 tsi
 ultimate tensile stress 58,000 pounds per square inch
 high ductility required.

Concrete
 in direct compression: 650 psi
 "in compression in cross breaking": 500 psi
 in shear: 100 psi
 in tension: nil
 live loads
 design live load for floors: 80 pounds per square foot
 columns designed for full LL on any 3 floors and 50% on the rest
 concrete mixes
 1 : 2 : 4 when subject to "cross bending"
 1 : 2½ : 5 for direct compression
 external walls and parapets 6" thick
 internal partitions 2½" thick

Today
Verco Building is part of the Myer Centre, which starts at North Terrace and goes through to Rundle Mall. A major refurbishment occurred in 1988 and the upper storeys in Verco Building are now leased to the South Australian Government. A large underground car park was built where the basement was in the Myer Redevelopment and was engineered by Adelaide firm Ginos Construction. The car park is leased to Myer Centre Management, and so is some of the office space inside.

It was listed on the South Australian Heritage Register on 11 September 1986.

References

External links
Photos:
Stage 1 – 1913 from Stephens Place
Stage 1 – 1913 from North Terrace
Stage 2 – 1915
Stage 2 – 1915
1924
2004
2008
2008

Buildings and structures in Adelaide
South Australian Heritage Register